The fungus Cochliobolus sativus is the teleomorph (sexual stage) of Bipolaris sorokiniana (anamorph) which is the causal agent of a wide variety of cereal diseases. The pathogen can infect and cause disease on roots (where it is known as common root rot), leaf and stem, and head tissue. C. sativus is extremely rare in nature and thus it is the asexual or anamorphic stage which causes infections. The two most common diseases caused by B. sorokiniana are spot blotch and common root rot, mainly on wheat and barley crops.

Identification 
The mycelium of B. sorokiniana is usually deep olive-brown. New cultures produce abundant simple conidiophores, which may be single or clustered and measure 6–10 x 110–220 μm with septations. Conidia develop laterally from pores beneath each conidiophore septum. Conidia are olive-brown and ovate to oblong, with rounded ends and a prominent basal scar. They measure 15–28 x 40–120 μm and are 3- to 10-septate. Some may be slightly curved. Their walls are smooth and noticeably thickened at the septa.

The sexual state (C. sativus), when formed in culture, is in the form of black, globose pseudothecia 300–400 μm in diameter, with erect beaks 50–200 μm long. Asci are clavate and measure 20–35 x 150–250 μm. Ascospores are hyaline, uniformly filamentous, and spirally flexed within asci. They measure 5–10 x 200–250 μm and are 4- to 10-septate.

Host species

Agropyron cristatum1, Allium sp. 1, Alopecurus pratensis1, Aneurolepidium chinense1, Avena sativa1

Bromus inermis1, B. marginatus1, B. willdenowii1

Calluna vulgaris1, Chloris gayana1, Cicer arietinum1, Clinelymus dahuricus1, C. sibiricus1, Cynodon dactylon1, C. transvaalensis1

Dactylis glomerata1

Echinochloa crus-galli1, Elymus junceus1

Festuca sp. 1

Guzmania sp. 1

Hordeum brevisubulatum1, H. distichon1, H. sativum var. hexastichon1, H. vulgare1, H. vulgare var. hexastichon1

Lablab purpureus1, Linum usitatissimum1, Lolium multiflorum1

Pennisetum typhoides1

Roegneria semicostata1

Saccharum sp. 1, Secale cereale1, Setaria italica1, Sorghum sp. 1

Taraxacum kok-saghyz1, Trisetum aestivum1, Triticum aestivum1, T. secale1, T. turgidum subsp. durum, T. vulgare1

Zea mays1

Notes

1. USDA ARS Fungal Database

Geographical distribution

Cochliobolus sativus has a world-wide distribution.

Notes

1. USDA ARS Fungal Database

Main diseases

Common root rot (barley); Common root rot (wheat); spot blotch (barley); Spot blotch (wheat)

Spot blotch of wheat

This is most important disease in non-tradition wheat growing areas. The B. sorokiniana comes with Pyrenophora tritici-repentis and causes millions of tons of wheat loss each year. The symptoms are blotch as well as induced senescence due to premature chlorophyll losses Rosyara et al., 2007.

References

External links 
 Index Fungorum
 USDA ARS Fungal Database
 Helminthosporium leaf blights: spot blotch and tan spot
 Diagnosis of Common Root Rot of Wheat and Barley

Fungal plant pathogens and diseases
Cereal diseases
Barley diseases
Wheat diseases
Cochliobolus
Fungi described in 1890